Nina Divíšková (12 July 1936 – 21 June 2021) was a Czech actress. She appeared in more than seventy films since 1967. She was the wife of the film director Jan Kačer. Her sister is ceramist Tamara Divíšková.

Selected filmography

References

External links 

1936 births
2021 deaths
Czech film actresses
Czech stage actresses
Czech television actresses
Academy of Performing Arts in Prague alumni
Actors from Brno